James J. Matejka Jr. (October 27, 1916 – November 30, 1979) of Chicago, Illinois, was an American philatelist at the local, national, and international level.

Collecting interests
Matejka was well regarded in all fields of philately, but was especially known for his philatelic collections of Czechoslovakia, Newfoundland airmail stamps and the postal history of the Alaska-Yukon Territory.

Philatelic activity

Matejka was active within most of the philatelic clubs in the Chicago, Illinois, area, including the Chicago Philatelic Society where he was awarded the Newbury Award in 1959.

At the national level, he was active and held various posts in the Society for Czechoslovak Philately, the American Air Mail Society and the Society of Philatelic Americans. He also served on the Citizens' Stamp Advisory Committee of the Post Office Department. Matejka also served as judge at various philatelic exhibitions.

Honors and awards
Matejka was a recipient in 1959 of the Newbury Award of the Chicago Philatelic Society. He signed the Roll of Distinguished Philatelists in 1979 and was named to the American Philatelic Society Hall of Fame in 1981.

See also
 Philatelic literature

References

1916 births
1979 deaths
American philatelists
People from Chicago
Signatories to the Roll of Distinguished Philatelists
American Philatelic Society